City Hunter (Sing si lip yan) is a 1993 Hong Kong action comedy film written and directed by Wong Jing. The film stars Jackie Chan, Joey Wong, Kumiko Goto, Chingmy Yau, Gary Daniels and Leon Lai. The film is based on the Japanese manga of the same name. The film was released in Hong Kong on 14 January 1993 along with Wong Jing's Fight Back to School III starring Stephen Chow.

Plot
Ryo Saeba and Kaori Makimura are assigned to locate Shizuko Imamura, the runaway daughter of the CEO of a prominent Japanese newspaper. Kaori leaves in the middle of the search, unhappy with the way Ryo ignores her romantic feelings for him and flirts with other women. Ryo finds Shizuko at a skateboarding park and a chase ensues, but she escapes in disguise.

Shizuko boards a luxury cruise liner, the Fuji Maru, with the ticket she found in the suit she stole. Kaori also boards the ship with her lustful cousin while Ryo sneaks inside to follow her. A terrorist gang led by MacDonald have plans to hijack it and take the rich passengers hostage with Police Officer Saeko Nogami and her buxom sidekick in pursuit.

Staying next door from each other, Shizuko overhears MacDonald's plan. MacDonald discovers her and sends one of his men to kill her, but she knocks him out and escapes. She then bumps into the ship's first officer, who takes her to the boiler room and reveals himself as a terrorist. When he attempts to silence Shizuko, Ryo, who had been staying there since his encounter with Kaori and her cousin at the swimming pool, saves her. When MacDonald's gang arrive, the officer is killed in the shootout while Ryo and Shizuko escape into the movie theater, where Game of Death is being shown. To beat two towering opponents, Ryo interprets Bruce Lee's techniques from the film.

At the ship's casino, a party hosted by the captain is interrupted when MacDonald kills the captain and terrorizes the partygoers, including Saeko and her sidekick. After robbing them of their valuables, he entices the rich patrons into a sadistic card game. A few opponents are quickly disposed of until Kao Ta, a skilled card gamer who uses his cards as shurikens, joins in. When MacDonald is distracted by seeing Ryo and Shizuko not far away, Ta and Saeko put an end to his game.

MacDonald's henchman Kim kidnaps Kaori and takes her to his room. When Ryo bursts in, both men fight before MacDonald and his men interrupt, capturing Ryo in the process. Kaori escapes, bumping into Shizuko, Saeko, and the rest of the main characters. They take down a gay terrorist trying to seduce Kaori's cousin and prepare to save Ryo.

The next day, Ryo is stood before a firing squad. Shizuko, Saeko, and her sidekick interrupt the planned execution, but are forced to separate by MacDonald's gang. Shizuko uses her gymnastic skills to defeat one henchman, Saeko saves Ta after he runs out of cards in a fight with several terrorists, and her sidekick falls off a ledge and is left unconscious. Ryo goes into the gaming parlor with his hands still tied, but is thrown into a Street Fighter II arcade game by Kim and suffers an electric shock. This causes him to hallucinate and think Kim is Ken from the game. After a failed attempt to defeat him as E. Honda, Ryo defeats him as Chun-Li.

As a Taiwanese counter terrorism unit, the "Thunderbolts Squad", arrives and take his men out, MacDonald blows up bombs he had set up all over the ship and takes Kaori hostage at the casino. When Ryo and Saeko arrive, he injures both women and starts a long fight with Ryo. However, MacDonald is thrown into the stage and dies when he accidentally steps on his remote, setting off the bombs behind the TV panels.

Ryo and Kaori find Shizuko and return to her father. He speaks to Ryo privately, seeing him as a future husband to Shizuko. Listening to their conversation, Kaori leaves in anger, unaware that Ryo has declined the man's offer. However, Ryo finds her and tries to apologize with a rose, but then Saeko drives up and flirts with him. He gives her the rose instead and furious, Kaori smashes him through the air with a big hammer. Ryo wakes up in his recurring dream with beautiful women at the swimming pool.

Cast
 Jackie Chan as Ryo Saeba
 Joey Wong as Kaori Makimura
Leila Tong as Kaori as a child
 Kumiko Goto as Shizuko Imamura
 Chingmy Yau as Saeko Nogami
 Carol Wan as Saeko's friend
 Leon Lai as Kao Ta the gambler (Kao Ta the Wanderer/Gao Da the Wanderer)
 Pal Sinn as Rocky Dung
 Lo Wai-kwong as Chen Ta-wen
 Eric Kot as DJ Hard
 Jan Lam as DJ Soft
 Richard Norton as Col. Donald "Don Mac" MacDonald
 Gary Daniels as Kim / MacDonald's henchman
 Yip San as Woman surprising Ryo
 Josephine Lam as Woman surprising Ryo
 Donna Chu as Woman surprising Ryo
 Michael Wong as Hideyuki Makimura
 Peter Lai as Man wearing white suit in store
 William Tuan as Cruise passenger
 Kenzo Hagiwara as Koji Imamura
 Vincent Laporte as Vincent Vu
 Mike Abbott as Mike Vu
 Louis Roth as Cruise Purser
 Bruce Lee as Billy Lo (archive footage)
 Kareem Abdul-Jabbar as Fighter on Film #2 in Ship's Theater (archive footage)
 Lee Tat-chiu as Ship crew member

Production notes
 The name of the Street Fighter character was changed to "E. Honde" from "E. Honda". This was because Chan had a contract with the Mitsubishi car company, and Honda is the name of a rival company.
 There were time constraints on the preparation of the film to release it on time for its release on the Chinese New Year. Near the end of filming, shots of Chan's final fight scene with Richard Norton, had him doubled by stunt performer Mars to save time on reshoots.
 According to his book I Am Jackie Chan: My Life in Action, Chan dislocated his shoulder during production.
 The gambling area filled with televisions and a dance floor was shot in the Shaw Brothers Studio.

Box office
In Hong Kong, the film grossed 30,843,062, making it the fourth top-grossing Hong Kong film of 1993. In Japan, the film grossed .

In South Korea, the film sold 808,329 tickets and grossed .

Home media
On 23 April 2001, a DVD was released by Hong Kong Legends in the United Kingdom in Region 2. Two years later, Fortune Star released a 3 disc set on 29 December 2003 with two other martial arts films: Story of Ricky and The Dragon from Russia. In the United States, the first DVD release was a port of the Mega Star Region 0 release repackaged by Tai Seng. Later on, 20th Century Fox Home Entertainment released a region 1 DVD in 2004 utilizing the remastered Fortune Star transfer. It was released again in 2012 by Shout Factory in a double feature single disc with Battle Creek Brawl on both DVD and Blu-ray.

All currently available versions restore a scene that was removed from both the theatrical release as well as the LaserDisc versions of the film. The scene involves one of Kaori's suitors going on a rant about foreign tourists (to wit, Richard Norton's band of terrorists) and saying that he hopes they die of AIDS in Chinese, only to discover that they understood him very well. The scene was removed because the film's distributors were concerned that foreign audiences might be offended by the homophobic nature of the scene.

Critical reception
The DVD release received mixed reviews in the early 2000s, with a 50% rating on Rotten Tomatoes. Critics praised the action sequences, but criticised the story and slapstick anime style. IGN concluded that "it fails as an adaptation but succeeds as a fun Jackie Chan flick."

See also
 Jackie Chan filmography
 List of Hong Kong films

References

External links
 
 
 
 City Hunter review at Trash City

1993 films
1993 martial arts films
1993 action comedy films
1990s martial arts comedy films
1990s Cantonese-language films
City Hunter
Films about murderers
Films about ship hijackings
Films directed by Wong Jing
Films set in Hong Kong
Golden Harvest films
Hong Kong action comedy films
Hong Kong martial arts comedy films
Hong Kong slapstick comedy films
Live-action films based on manga
Films set on ships
1990s Hong Kong films